Chronic pancreatitis is a long-standing inflammation of the pancreas that alters the organ's normal structure and functions. It can present as episodes of acute inflammation in a previously injured pancreas, or as chronic damage with persistent pain or malabsorption. It is a disease process characterized by irreversible damage to the pancreas as distinct from reversible changes in acute pancreatitis.

Signs and symptoms
 Upper abdominal pain: Upper abdominal pain which increases after drinking or eating, lessens when fasting or sitting and leaning forward. Some people may not suffer pain.
 Nausea and vomiting
 Steatorrhea: Frequent, oily, foul-smelling bowel movements. Damage to the pancreas reduces the production of pancreatic enzymes that aid digestion, which can result in malnutrition. Fats and nutrients are not absorbed properly, leading to loose, greasy stool known as steatorrhea.
 Weight loss even when eating habits and amounts are normal.
 Diabetes type 1: Chronic pancreatitis can affect the ability of the pancreatic islets to produce insulin to regulate glucose levels, leading to diabetes type 1. Symptoms of diabetes type 1 include increased hunger and thirst, frequent urination, weight loss, and fatigue.

Causes
Among the causes of chronic pancreatitis are the following:

The relationship between etiologic factors, genetic predisposition, and the pace of disease progression requires further clarification, though recent research indicates smoking may be a high-risk factor to develop chronic pancreatitis. In a small group of patients chronic pancreatitis has been shown to be hereditary. Almost all patients with cystic fibrosis have established chronic pancreatitis, usually from birth. Cystic fibrosis gene mutations have also been identified in patients with chronic pancreatitis but in whom there were no other manifestations of cystic fibrosis. Obstruction of the pancreatic duct because of either a benign or malignant process may result in chronic pancreatitis.

Pathophysiology

The mechanism of chronic pancreatitis viewed from a genetic standpoint indicates early onset of severe epigastric pain beginning in childhood. It is an autosomal dominant disease, chronic pancreatitis disease is identified in the cationic trypsinogen gene PRSS1, and mutation, R122H. R122H is the most common mutation for hereditary chronic pancreatitis with replacement of arginine with histidine at amino acid position 122 of the trypsinogen protein. There are, of course, other mechanisms – alcohol, malnutrition, smoking – each exhibiting its own effect on the pancreas.

Diagnosis
The diagnosis of chronic pancreatitis is based on tests on pancreatic structure and function. Serum amylase and lipase may be moderately elevated in cases of chronic pancreatitis. A secretin stimulation test is considered the best test for diagnosis of chronic pancreatitis. Other tests used to determine chronic pancreatitis are serum trypsinogen, computed tomography, ultrasound and biopsy.

When chronic pancreatitis is caused by genetic factors, elevations in ESR, IgG4, rheumatoid factor, ANA and anti-smooth muscle antibody may be detected.

On CT scan, pancreatic and bile duct dilatation, atrophy of pancreas, multiple calcifications of the pancreas, and enlargement of pancreatic glands can be found.

On MRI scan, there is a low T1 signal due to inflammation, fibrosis, focal lesions, and calcifications. In those who are given a contrast agent, there would be a higher T1 signal with late gadolinium enhancement due to compression from the fibrotic areas. The overall thickness of the pancreas will be reduced. Magnetic resonance cholangiopancreatography (MRCP) is the most useful option in accessing the pancreatic duct and bile duct.

Treatment
The different treatment options for management of chronic pancreatitis are medical measures, therapeutic endoscopy and surgery. Treatment is directed, when possible, to the underlying cause, and to relieve pain and malabsorption. Insulin dependent diabetes mellitus may occur and need long-term insulin therapy. The abdominal pain can be very severe and require high doses of analgesics, sometimes including opiates. Alcohol cessation and dietary modifications (low-fat diet) are important to manage pain and slow the calcific process. Antioxidants may help but it is unclear if the benefits are meaningful.

Pancreatic enzymes
Pancreatic enzyme replacement is often effective in treating the malabsorption and steatorrhea associated with chronic pancreatitis. Treatment of CP consists of administration of a solution of pancreatic enzymes with meals. Some patients do have pain reduction with enzyme replacement and since they are relatively safe, giving enzyme replacement to a chronic pancreatitis patient is an acceptable step in treatment for most patients. Treatment may be more likely to be successful in those without involvement of large ducts and those with idiopathic pancreatitis.

Surgery
Surgery to treat chronic pancreatitis tends to be divided into two areas – resectional and drainage procedures. Among the reasons to opt for surgery is if there is a pseudocyst, fistula, ascites, or a fixed obstruction. The Puestow procedure may be used for treatment of chronic pancreatitis.

Epidemiology 
The annual incidence of chronic pancreatitis is 5 to 12 per 100,000 persons, the prevalence is 50 per 100,000 persons.
In 2021, Venturi reported that pancreas is able to absorb in great quantity radioactive cesium (Cs-134 and Cs-137) causing chronic pancreatitis and probably pancreatic cancer with damage of pancreatic islands with Type 3c (pancreatogenic) diabetes.

See also
 Exocrine pancreatic insufficiency

References

Further reading

External links 

Medical emergencies
Pancreas disorders

de:Pankreatitis#Chronische Pankreatitis